The Oliver O. Stokes House, in Harding County, South Dakota, in Harding, was built in 1889.  It was listed on the National Register of Historic Places in 1987.

It is located on the west side of the only road in Harding, a north-south section road, now known as Harding Road.

The house, built in 1889, was the first frame house built in the county.

References

		
National Register of Historic Places in Harding County, South Dakota
Houses completed in 1889